The Cedar Grove Cemetery is a non-sectarian rural cemetery in New London, Connecticut.  It was established in 1851 on 39 acres and designed by Dr. Horatio Stone.  The cemetery is located at the intersection of Broad Street and Jefferson Avenue.

Points of interest
As New London developed in the late 19th century, remains from earlier cemeteries in the city were relocated to the Cedar Grove Cemetery.

The cemetery features the Comrades Monument, which was erected about 1900 by the Grand Army of the Republic to honor Civil War veterans buried in the cemetery. The monument is about 23 feet tall and features a life-sized figure of a Civil War soldier on top of a pedestal.

The cemetery has been a place of burial for leading citizens of New London. It is the resting place for a governor of Connecticut, two United States senators, ten members of Congress, a member of the Continental Congress and a recipient of the Medal of Honor.

Notable interments
 Nathan Belcher, US Representative
 Augustus Brandegee, US Representative
 Frank Bosworth Brandegee, US Senator
 Henry Burbeck, Brigadier General in the War of 1812
 Joshua Coit, US Representative
 Thomas H. Cushing, Brigadier General in the War of 1812
 Harry Daghlian, Manhattan Project physicist killed by the Demon core
 Nicoll Fosdick, US Representative
 Richard P. Freeman, US Representative
 Lyman Law, US Representative
 Richard Law, member of the Continental Congress
 Amasa Learned preacher, lawyer, and politician
 Gustavus W. Smith, Major General in the Confederate States Army
 Benjamin Stark, US Senator
 Griffin Alexander Stedman, Union Army Colonel in the American Civil War
 Thomas M. Waller, Governor
 George C. Williams, Civil War recipient of the Medal of Honor
 Thomas Wheeler Williams, US Representative

References

External links
 
 

Buildings and structures in New London, Connecticut
Cemeteries in New London County, Connecticut
Rural cemeteries